Blowhard may refer to:

Places
 Blowhard, Victoria, a rural locality in Australia
 Blowhard Stream, a tributary of the Garry River in New Zealand
 Blowhard Ravine, a valley of the West Branch Feather River at Inskip, California, US

Arts and entertainment
 Blowhard (album), by the noise rock band DUH
 Blowhard (film), a 1979 Canadian animated film by Brad Caslor and Christopher Hinton
 Blowhard (The Tunnelers), a fictional character in Marvel Comics
 Broken Down Race Horse (Blowhard), a 1967 sculpture by Winston Bronnum in Penobsquis, New Brunswick, Canada
 "Blowhard", an episode of US TV comedy series Action
 "Blowhard", a song on the album Rub It Better by British band General Public

Other uses
 Waycross Blowhards, a former name of the minor league baseball team Waycross Moguls, from Waycross, Georgia, US

See also
 BLOHARDS, supporters of the Boston Red Sox baseball team